Liliatrematidae is a family of trematodes belonging to the order Plagiorchiida.

Genera:
 Liliatrema Gubanov, 1953

References

Plagiorchiida